Koynare Rocks (‘Skali Koynare’ ska-'li koy-'na-re) are a small group of rocks in Hero Bay off the north coast Livingston Island in the South Shetland Islands, Antarctica situated  northeast of Siddins Point,  northwest of Bezmer Point, and  south of Miladinovi Islets.  The area was visited by early 19th century sealers.

The rocks are named after the town of Koynare in northwestern Bulgaria.

Location

See also 
 Composite Antarctic Gazetteer
 List of Antarctic islands south of 60° S
 SCAR
 Territorial claims in Antarctica

Maps
 L.L. Ivanov. Antarctica: Livingston Island and Greenwich, Robert, Snow and Smith Islands. Scale 1:120000 topographic map.  Troyan: Manfred Wörner Foundation, 2009.

Notes

References
 Koynare Rocks. SCAR Composite Antarctic Gazetteer
 Bulgarian Antarctic Gazetteer. Antarctic Place-names Commission. (details in Bulgarian, basic data in English)

External links
 Koynare Rocks. Copernix satellite image

Rock formations of Livingston Island
Bulgaria and the Antarctic